Procurement is the method of discovering and agreeing to terms and purchasing goods, services, or other works from an external source, often with the use of a tendering or competitive bidding process. The term may also refer to a contractual obligation to "procure", i.e. to "ensure" that something is done. When a government agency buys goods or services through this practice, it is referred to as government procurement or public procurement.

Procurement as an organizational process is intended to ensure that the buyer receives goods, services, or works at the best possible price when aspects such as quality, quantity, time, and location are compared. Corporations and public bodies often define processes intended to promote fair and open competition for their business while minimizing risks such as exposure to fraud and collusion.

Almost all purchasing decisions include factors such as delivery and handling, marginal benefit, and fluctuations in the prices of goods. Organisations which have adopted a corporate social responsibility perspective are also likely to require their purchasing activity to take wider societal and ethical considerations into account. On the other hand, the introduction of external regulations concerning accounting practices can affect ongoing buyer-supplier relations in unforeseen manners.

History
Formalized acquisition of goods and services has its roots in military logistics, but the first written records of what would be recognized now as the purchasing department of an industrial operation relate to the railway companies of the 19th century: An early reference book from 1922 explains that

Overview
An important distinction should be made between analyses without risk and those with risk. Where risk is involved, either in the costs or the benefits, the concept of best value should be employed.

Procurement activities are also often split into two distinct categories, direct and indirect spend. Direct spend refers to the production-related procurement that encompasses all items that are part of finished products, such as raw materials, components and parts. Direct procurement, which is the focus in supply chain management, directly affects the production process of manufacturing firms. In contrast, indirect procurement concerns non-production-related acquisition: obtaining "operating resources" which a company purchases to enable its operations. Indirect procurement comprises a wide variety of goods and services, from standardized items like office supplies and machine lubricants to complex and costly products and services like heavy equipment, consulting services, and outsourcing services.

Topics

Procurement vs. sourcing vs. acquisition
Procurement is one component of the broader concept of sourcing and acquisition. Typically procurement is viewed as more tactical in nature (the process of physically buying a product or service) and sourcing and acquisition are viewed as more strategic and encompassing.

The Institute for Supply Management (ISM) defines strategic sourcing as the process of identifying sources that could provide needed products or services for the acquiring organization. The term procurement is used to reflect the entire purchasing process or cycle, and not just the tactical components. ISM defines procurement as an organizational function that includes specification development, value analysis, supplier market research, negotiation, buying activities, contract administration, inventory control, traffic, receiving and stores. Purchasing refers to the major function of an organization that is responsible for acquisition of required materials, services and equipment.

The United States Defense Acquisition University (DAU) defines procurement as the act of buying goods and services for the government.
DAU defines acquisition as the conceptualization, initiation, design, development, test, contracting, production, deployment, Logistics Support (LS), modification, and disposal of weapons and other systems, supplies, or services (including construction) to satisfy Department of Defense needs, intended for use in or in support of military missions.

There is also an important distinction between the terms "procurement" and "purchasing"; the clear distinction between the two is often lost amidst the ambiguities of international English. As a broad definition, "procurement" is the overarching function that describes the activities and processes to acquire goods and services. Importantly, and distinct from "purchasing", it involves the activities involved in establishing fundamental requirements, sourcing activities such as market research and vendor evaluation and negotiation of contracts. It can also include the purchasing activities required to order and receive goods.

Acquisition and sourcing are therefore much wider concepts than procurement.

Multiple sourcing business models and acquisition models exist.

Acquisition processes
A linear acquisition process used in industry and defense is shown in the next figure, in this case relating to acquisition in the technology field. The process is defined by a series of phases during which technology is defined and matured into viable concepts, which are subsequently developed and readied for production, after which the systems produced are supported in the field.

The process allows for a given system to enter the process at any of the development phases. For example, a system using unproven technology would enter at the beginning stages of the process and would proceed through a lengthy period of technology maturation, while a system based on mature and proven technologies might enter directly into engineering development or, conceivably, even production. The process itself includes four phases of development:
 Concept and technology development is intended to explore alternative concepts based on assessments of operational needs, technology readiness, risk, and affordability.
 The concept and technology development phase begins with concept exploration. During this stage, concept studies are undertaken to define alternative concepts and to provide information about capability and risk that would permit an objective comparison of competing concepts.
 The system development and demonstration phase could be entered directly as a result of a technological opportunity and urgent user need, as well as having come through concept and technology development.
 The last, and longest phase is the sustainable and disposal phase of the program. During this phase all necessary activities are accomplished to maintain and sustain the system in the field in the most cost-effective manner possible.

Some aspects of a procurement process may need to be initiated ahead of the majority of the project, for example where there are extensive lead times. Such cases may be referred to as "advance procurement".

Many writers also refer to procurement as a cyclical process, which commences with a definition of business needs and develops a specification, identifies suppliers and adopted appropriate methods for consulting with them, inviting and evaluating proposals, secures on contract and takes delivery of a new asset or accepts performance of a service, manages the ownership of the asset or the delivery of the service and reaches an end-of-life point where the asset becomes due for replacement or the service contract terminates. At this point the cycle would recommence.

Sourcing business model
Procurement officials increasingly realize that their make-buy supplier decisions fall along a continuum from simple buying transactions to more complex, strategic buyer-supplier collaborations. It is important for procurement officials to use the right sourcing business model that fits each buyer-seller situation. There are seven models along the sourcing continuum: basic provider, approved provider, preferred provider, performance-based/managed services model, vested business model, shared services model and equity partnerships.
 A basic provider model is transaction-based; it usually has a set price for individual products and services for which there are a wide range of standard market options. Typically these products or services are readily available, with little differentiation in what is offered.
 An approved provider model uses a transaction-based approach where goods and services are purchased from prequalified suppliers that meet certain performance or other selection criteria. 
 The preferred provider model also uses a transaction-based economic model, but a key difference between the preferred provider and the other transaction-based models is that the buyer has chosen to move to a supplier relationship where there is an opportunity for the supplier to add incremental value to the buyer's business to meet strategic objectives.
 A performance-based (or managed services model) is generally a formal, longer-term supplier agreement that combines a relational contracting model with an output-based economic model. It seeks to drive supplier accountability for output-based service-level agreements (SLAs) and/or cost reduction targets.
 A vested sourcing business model is a hybrid relationship that combines an outcome-based economic model with a relational contracting model. Companies enter into highly collaborative arrangements designed to create and share value for buyers and suppliers above and beyond.
 A shared services model is typically an internal organization based on an arms-length outsourcing arrangement. Using this approach, processes are often centralized into an SSO that charges business units or users for the services they use. 
 An equity partnership creates a legally binding entity; it can take different legal forms, from buying a supplier (an acquisition), to creating a subsidiary, to equity-sharing joint ventures or entering into cooperative (co-op) arrangements.

Procurement software

Procurement software (often labeled as e-procurement software) manages purchasing processes electronically or via cloud computing.

Procurement performance
The Chartered Institute of Procurement & Supply (CIPS) promotes a model of "five rights", which it suggests are "a traditional formula expressing the basic objectives of procurement and the general criteria by which procurement performance is measured", namely that goods and services purchased should be of the right quality, in the right quantity, delivered to the right place at the right time and obtained at the right price. CIPS has in the past also offered an alternative listing of the five rights as "buy[ing] goods or services of the right quality, in the right quantity, from the right source, at the right time and at the right price. Right source is added as a sixth right in CIPS' 2018 publication, Contract Administration.

Delivery on savings goals is an important part of the procurement function, but this objective is generally seen as value generation rather than cost reduction. CIPS also notes that securing savings is "one measure of purchasing performance", but argues that savings should only be used as a measure of performance where they are "a reflection of the [organisation]'s ... expectations of the purchasing and supply management function". CIPS distinguishes between "savings", which can reduce budgets, and "cost avoidance", which "attempts to thwart price increases and to keep within budget". Examples of savings as a beneficial outcome include:
agreeing a reduction in price, obtaining the same item for less cost
sourcing, or developing a supply of, a lower quality item at a reduced cost, where the item is still fit for purpose
obtaining added value for the same cost, e.g. negotiating extended warranties, additional spare parts etc.

Ardent Partners published a report in 2011 which presented a comprehensive, industry-wide view into what was happening in the world of procurement at that time by drawing on the experience, performance, and perspective of nearly 250 chief procurement officers and other procurement executives. The report included the main procurement performance and operational benchmarks that procurement leaders use to gauge the success of their organizations. This report found that the average procurement department manages 60.6% of total enterprise spend. This measure, commonly called "spend under management" or "managed spend", refers to the percentage of total enterprise spend (which includes all direct and indirect spend) that a procurement organization manages or influences. Alternatively, the term may refer to the percentage of addressable spend which is influenced by procurement, "addressable spend" being the expenditure which could potentially be influenced. The average procurement department also achieved an annual saving of 6.7% in the last reporting cycle, sourced 52.6% of its addressable spend, and has a contract compliance rate of 62.6%.

Consultants A.T. Kearney have developed a model for assessing the performance of a procurement organisation or the procurement function within a wider organisation, known as ROSMASM (Return on Supply Management Assets). According to the 2016 ROSMA Performance Check Report, What Good Looks Like, CIPS promotes organisational self-assessment using the ROSMA Performance Check, arguing that it enables a procurement department to "measure and explain procurement and supply's value in terms your CFO and CEO will understand, using a common financial standard". Findings in 2020 suggested that "top quartile procurement performers have ROSMA scores two to three times higher than those in the middle two quartiles". A.T. Kearney's report suggests a close match between the self-reported performance of CPOs in the best performing departments and the view of procurement held by the CFO and the organisation more widely, and also notes that weaker performers or "inconsequentials" share a distinct profile marked by lack of "identifiable leadership accountable for procurement's performance.

Spend under management also contributes to an additional measure of procurement performance or procurement efficiency: procurement operating expense as a percentage of managed spend.

Joint procurement
Joint procurement takes place when two or more organisations share purchasing activities, and therefore has a more specifically buyer-side focus than many examples of collaborative buyer-seller relationships. Kamann, van der Vaart and de Vries propose a "theoretical frame of reference" to explain various approaches to understanding "why would companies work together in the first place?"
a transaction cost economics approach, where the total transaction costs of the actors involved are lower when they work together
a resource dependence approach, and the resource based view, where the group of actors is able to create a resource, market power, which they would be unable to exercise independently
neo-classical economics' case, arguing that certain functions become separate, specialised units in order to obtain scale effects
neo-institutionalism - the argument that actors work together because it is the thing to do these days.
They note also that many large and powerful companies "do not have - nor feel - the need to go together".

Joint or collaborative procurement is a common practice within public sector procurement. There are central purchasing bodies in many countries which coordinate joint purchasing activities for public sector organisations. A report commissioned by the European Parliament's Committee on the Internal Market and Consumer Protection (IMCO) has recommended that EU Member States "should consider creating Central Purchasing Bodies (CPBs)" in order to secure "coherent and coordinated procurement".

Relationship with Finance

Procurement and Finance have, as functions within the corporate structure, been at odds. The contentious nature of their relationship can perhaps be attributed to the history of procurement itself. Historically, Procurement has been considered Finance's underling. One reason behind this perception can be ascribed to semantics. When Procurement was in its infancy, it was referred to as a "commercial" operation. And so the procurement department was referred to as the commercial department rather than the procurement department: the word "commercial" was understood to be associated with money. And so it was obvious that Procurement would become directly answerable to Finance. Another factor, equally grounded in semantics, was that procurement departments (or rather, commercial departments) were always seen as "spending the money". This impression was enough to situate Procurement within the Finance function.

Procurement and Finance are functions with interests that are mutually irreconcilable. Whereas Procurement is fundamentally concerned with the spending or disbursal of money, Finance, by its very nature, performs a cost-cutting role. That is fundamentally the reason why Procurement's aspirations have been constantly checked by Finance's cost-cutting imperatives. This notion, however, has been changing as more chief procurement officers have begun to argue for more autonomy and less interference from Finance departments.

Electronic procurement 
Electronic procurement is the purchasing of goods by businesses through the internet or other networked computer connection. Electronic data interchange (EDI) was a forerunner to electronic procurement, this consisted of standardized transmission of data such as inventories and good required electronically. Schoenherr argues that EDI developed from standardized manifests for deliveries to Berlin during the Berlin Airlift which were applied by DuPont in the 1960s and argues that Material requirements planning and Enterprise resource planning were both forerunners to electronic procurement.

Alternative competitive bidding procedures
There are several alternatives to traditional competitive bid tendering that are available in formal procurement. One approach that has gained increasing momentum in the construction industry and among developing economies is the selection in planning (SIP) process, which enables project developers and equipment purchasers to make significant changes to their requirements with relative ease. The SIP process also enables vendors and contractors to respond with greater accuracy and competitiveness as a result of the generally longer lead times they are afforded.

University of Tennessee research shows that request for solution and request for association (also known as request for partner or request for partnership) methods are also gaining traction as viable alternatives and more collaborative methods for selecting strategic suppliers – especially for outsourcing.

Public procurement

Public procurement, also known as government procurement, is when a governing body purchases goods, works, and services from an organization for themselves or the taxpayers. In 2019, public procurement accounted for approximately 12% of GDP in OECD countries and in 2021 the World Bank Group estimated that public procurement made up about 15% of global GDP.

Benefits of public procurement 
Public procurement is based on the idea that governments should direct their society while giving the private sector the freedom to decide the best practices to produce the desired goods and services. One benefit of public procurement is its ability to cultivate innovation and economic growth. The public sector picks the most capable nonprofit or for-profit organizations available to issue the desired good or service to the taxpayers. This produces competition within the private sector to gain these contracts that then reward the organizations that can supply more cost-effective and quality goods and services. Some contracts also have specific clauses to promote working with minority-led, women-owned businesses and/or state-owned enterprises. Competition is a key component of public procurement which affects the outcomes of the whole process. There is a great amount of competition over public procurements because of the massive amount of money that flows through these systems; It is estimated that approximately one trillion USD is spent on public procurement worldwide every year.

Green public procurement 
In public procurement, contracting authorities and entities take environmental issues into account when tendering for goods or services. The goal is to reduce the impact of the procurement on human health and the environment.

In the European Union, the Commission has adopted its communication on public procurement for a better environment, where proposes a political target of 50% Green public procurement to be reached by the Member States by 2010. The European Commission has recommended GPP criteria for 21 product/service groups which may be used by any public authority in Europe.

The EU has also launched the GPP 2020, which aims to implement 100 low-carbon tenders.

Social and environmental considerations can be applied to contracts both above and below the threshold for application of the EU Procurement Directives. The 2014 Procurement Directives enable public authorities to take environmental considerations into account. This applies during pre-procurement, as part of the procurement process itself, and in the performance of the contract. Rules regarding exclusion and selection aim to ensure a minimum level of compliance with environmental law by contractors and sub-contractors. Techniques such as life-cycle costing, specification of sustainable production processes, and use of environmental award criteria are available to help contracting authorities identify environmentally preferable bids.

Accessible procurement 
The United States Section 508 and European Commission standard EN 301 549 require public procurement to promote accessibility. This means buying products and technology that have accessibility features built in to promote access for the around 1 billion people worldwide who have disabilities.

Challenges for public procurement 
One issue of public procurement is the inability of governments to measure economic productivity, because as the size of public procurement systems substantially grows, so do their complexity and influence. Public procurement is heavily embedded in all forms of public sector goods and services, from health care to road maintenance, thus making it difficult for the government to monitor the impacts, positive or negative. Monitoring public spending and its impact is important to reform public procurement, especially when pending economic instability calls for proactive responses.

In some cases, if a nation is extremely impoverished, it may not have the necessary funds or a large enough private sector to even procure companies to issue the goods or services to the people. Thus, omitting public procurement as a potential governing practice.

Another concern with public procurement is corruption; companies have much to gain from bribing public officials to obtain these procurements. In societies where corruption is endemic and enforcement is low, public officials are incentivized to accept bribes due to either necessity or greed. Academic research shows that discretion in procurement decisions is beneficial in countries with a high level of human capital, but is detrimental in low-human capital jurisdictions.

Fraud 
The OECD has published guidelines on how to detect and combat bid rigging.

Procurement fraud can be defined as dishonestly obtaining an advantage, avoiding an obligation or causing a loss to public property or various means during procurement process by public servants, contractors or any other person involved in the procurement. An example is a kickback, whereby a dishonest agent of the supplier pays a dishonest agent of the purchaser to select the supplier's bid, often at an inflated price. Other frauds in procurement include:
 Collusion among bidders to reduce competition.
 Providing bidders with advance "inside" information.
 Submission of false or inflated invoices for services and products that are not delivered or work that is never done. "Shadow vendors", shell companies that are set up and used for billing, may be used in such schemes.
 Intentional substitution of substandard materials without the customer's agreement.
 Use of "sole source" contracts without proper justification.
 Use of prequalification standards in specifications to unnecessarily exclude otherwise qualified contractors.
 Dividing requirements to qualify for small-purchase procedures to avoid scrutiny for contract review procedures of larger purchases.

Integrity Pacts are one tool to prevent fraud and other irregular practices in procurement projects. The G20 has recommended their use in their 2019 Compendium of Good Practices for Promoting Integrity and Transparency in Infrastructure Development. A major European Commission pilot project entitled Integrity Pacts - Civil Control Mechanism for Safeguarding EU Funds is seeking to evaluate the effectiveness of Integrity Pacts in reducing corruption in 17 EU-funded projects in 11 Member States with a total value of over EUR 920 million.

Roles in procurement

Personnel who undertake procurement on behalf of an organization may be referred to as procurement officers, professionals or specialists, buyers or supply managers. The US Federal Acquisition Regulation refers to Contracting Officers. Staff in managerial positions may be referred to as Purchasing Managers or Procurement Managers.

A Purchasing or Procurement Manager's responsibilities may include:
approving orders
seeking reliable vendors or suppliers to provide quality goods at reasonable prices
negotiating prices and contracts
reviewing technical specifications for raw materials, components, equipment or buildings
determining and monitoring quantity and timing of deliveries (more commonly in small companies)
forecasting upcoming demand
supervision of other procurement staff and agents.

Category management represents a system of organising the roles of staff within a procurement team "in such a way as to focus ... on the [external] supply markets of an organisation", rather than being organised according to the organisation's internal departmental structure.

In many larger organizations the procurement and supply function is led by a board-level or other senior position such as a Director of Supply Chain  or a Chief Procurement Officer.

Independent or third party personnel who undertake procurement or negotiate purchases on behalf of an organization may be called purchasing agents or buying agents. A commercial agent may both purchase and sell on behalf of a third party.

US Bureau of Labor Statistics research found that there were 526,200 purchasing manager, buyer and purchasing agent positions in the United States in 2019. Various writers have noted that businesses may reduce the numbers of purchasing staff during a recession along with staff in other business areas, despite a tendency to become more dependent on bought-in goods and services as operations contract. For example, US business executive Steve Collins observed that in one major company the purchasing staffbase "was downsized some 30% during the [2010] recession, 'but the expectations for the remaining employees remained unchanged ... The additional workload placed on the remaining employees following the downsizing created a much more challenging environment'". In 2021 the Australasian Procurement and Construction Council (APCC) put forward an appeal asking everyone working in the procurement profession in Australia to include the term in their occupational title when completing their August 2021 census return.

The European Commission issued a recommendation in October 2017 directed towards the "professionalisation of public procurement" so that Member States could "attract, develop and retain" staff in public purchasing roles, focus on performance and "make the most of the available tools and techniques". Research undertaken in 2020 highlighted the importance of social or "soft" skills within the skill sets of professional procurement staff.

Gender: women in procurement
Procurement and purchasing roles are generally open to both men and women, but leaders of the profession recognise that women face "the same challeges as men, [including] the need for recognition, and [the need] to influence the organisations they work for", but with additional challenges such as the need to be "twice as good" to prove their capability in order to gain the appreciation of their peers and their senior colleagues. Some writers have observed that there is limited opportunity for women to enter procurement because of stereotypes vewing some roles as not appropriate for women.

A "Women in Procurement" event held at Khobar in Saudi Arabia in 2016 identified networking among women working in the profession as a valuable tool for supporting women in the profession.

Obligation to procure
A contractual obligation to "procure" that something happens refers to an absolute obligation to ensure that the action is done or the condition is met, for example a contract with a principal supplier may include a clause requiring the company to "procure" that its subsidiaries, holding companies and other associated businesses undertake the same commitments as those contractually imposed on the principal. The use of the word "procure" in a joint venture agreement between Nearfield Ltd., Lincoln Nominees Ltd., and other partners, in relation to the utilisation of a bank loan, gave rise to a dispute between the parties regarding the meaning of the word "procure", which was resolved in 2006 by the judge, Peter Smith, confirming that the "normal meaning of the word" is clear and well understood:In this case the obligation to "procure the payment" of the loan amounted to a guarantee of that loan.

See also 

 Agreement on Government Procurement
 Bidder conferences
 Contract management
 E-procurement
 Expediting
 Global sourcing
 Group purchasing organization
 MESC
 Procurement outsourcing
 Performance Based Contracting
 Selection in planning
 Strategic sourcing
 Syndicated procurement
 Tender notification

References

Bibliography 

 
 Benslimane, Y.; Plaisent, M.; Bernard, P.: Investigating Search Costs and Coordination Costs in Electronic Markets: A Transaction Costs Economics Perspective, in: Electronic Markets, 15, 3, 2005, pp. 213–224.
 Hodges Silverstein, S.; Sager, T.:  2015. Legal Procurement Handbook (New York: Buying Legal Council).
  Transportation services procurement.
 Keith, B.; Vitasek, K.; Manrodt, K.; Kling, J.: 2016. Strategic Sourcing in the New Economy: Harnessing the Potential of Sourcing Business Models for Modern Procurement (New York: Palgrave Macmillan).

Attribution

External links 

 Federal Procurement Data System (United States)
 Green public procurement (European Commission)
 Systems Engineering Fundamentals. Defense Acquisition University Press, 2001
 Disability:INclusive Workplaces – Accessible Technology Procurement Toolkit

 
Business terms
Systems engineering
Supply chain management